Yangcheng Lake is a freshwater lake about  northeast of the city of Suzhou in Jiangsu Province, and ranges in depth from . It is the most famous area of origin for the Chinese mitten crab, which is considered a delicacy.

Yangcheng lake is located between Lake Tai and the Yangtze River. The -long Yangcheng West Lake Tunnel (阳澄西湖隧道) runs underneath the lake, and the lake itself is served by both a mainline high-speed railway station Yangchenghu railway station & a station of the Suzhou Rail Transit system; Yangchenghu South station.
 
The Chinese mitten crabs migrate from Yangcheng Lake towards the Yangtze delta for mating in September and October. The local fishermen harvest the animals during this migration.

References

External links 
 China Daily article on faked origins of Hairy Crabs
 Article on the lake and the crab by the Suzhou government

Lakes of Suzhou